St Kilda Football Club competed in the 2009 Australian Football League (AFL) premiership season.  They won a club record 19 consecutive matches between Round 1 and Round 19 of the season and qualified for the 2009 finals series in first position as the minor premiers –  the club's third minor premiership. The club won through to the 2009 AFL Grand Final after qualifying and preliminary finals wins, but were defeated by Geelong by 12 points.

Summary

NAB Cup
St Kilda was eliminated from the 2009 NAB Cup in the opening round, with Brisbane 1.8.8 (65) defeating St Kilda 0.8.8 (56).

Home and away rounds
In Round 1 of the 2009 season, Zac Dawson made a surprise debut for St Kilda after being promoted from the rookie list in time to confront Sydney at Docklands as St Kilda defenders Matt Maguire and Max Hudghton were injured. St Kilda 12.8 (80) defeated Sydney 9.11 (65) at Etihad Stadium in front of 32,442 spectators. In Round 2, Adelaide 10.9 (69) lost to St Kilda 15.11 (101) before 41,189 at AAMI Stadium. St Kilda 25.11 (161) defeated West Coast 9.10 (64) at Etihad Stadium in front of 29,006. Round 4 saw  defeat  by 83 points, and restrict them to 4.4 (28), their second-lowest ever score at that time and the equal-lowest score ever recorded at Etihad Stadium (tied with 's 3.10 (28) in 2002). In round 5, St Kilda restricted Port Adelaide to their second-lowest score in their club history, going down 15.12 (102) to 5.6 (36). The 6th round saw the Western Bulldogs 11.10 (76) lost to St Kilda 14.20 (104) in front of 36,302 at Etihad Stadium. Round 7 saw St Kilda and Collingwood play a Monday night game, the AFL's first for several seasons. St Kilda won easily 20.8 (128) to Collingwood 5.10 (40), making it the lowest Collingwood score under Mick Malthouse as coach. Round 8 saw St Kilda 13.12 (90) defeat Essendon 10.11 (71) at Etihad Stadium in front of 45,594. Round 9 saw St Kilda 14.13 (97) defeat the Brisbane Lions 13.3 (81) at Docklands Stadium in front of 30,673. In Round 10 St Kilda held Melbourne goalless in the second half of their 37-point victory, St Kilda 11.17 (83) to Melbourne 6.10 (46). In Round 11 St Kilda won its 11th consecutive game, breaking the previous club record of 10 set in 2004 by beating North Melbourne by 46 points, despite trailing by almost five goals in the first quarter. In Round 12 Carlton 14.11 (95) were defeated by St Kilda 16.8 (104) at Docklands Stadium in front of 50,820. In Round 13, St Kilda 13.14 (92) defeated Richmond 5.6 (36) at Docklands Stadium in front 38,196. The Round 14 clash between St Kilda and Geelong broke the previous record of the largest crowd at an AFL game held at Docklands Stadium with an attendance of 54,444. St Kilda 14.7 (91) defeated Geelong 13.7 (85). St Kilda extended its winning streak to 15 wins in round 15, with a hard-fought victory over West Coast 11.4 (70) to St Kilda 13.12 (90). Round 16 saw St Kilda 15.15 (105) defeat Adelaide 7.6 (48) at Etihad Stadium. In Round 17 St Kilda 16.10 (106) defeated Western Bulldogs 9.7 (61) at Etihad Stadium. Round 18 saw Sydney 13.15 (93) defeated by St Kilda 13.15 (94) at the SCG. Round 19 saw Hawthorn 7.7 (49) defeated by St Kilda 10.14 (74) at Aurora Stadium. Round 20 saw St Kildas first loss of the season proper kicking 16.12 (108) to Essendon 16.14 (110) at Etihad Stadium. Round 21 St Kilda 8.11 (59) lost to North Melbourne 10.4 (64) at Etihad Stadium. St Kilda played its first game at the MCG in Round 22 and defeated Melbourne 10.7 (67) to St Kilda 17.12 (114).

St Kilda qualified for the 2009 finals series in first position, winning the clubs third minor premiership with 20 wins and 2 losses, one of the most dominant home and away seasons ever in AFL history.

Finals series
In the first qualifying final, St Kilda 12.8 (80) defeated Collingwood 7.10 (52) at the MCG. In the first preliminary final, St Kilda 19.6 (60) defeated the Western Bulldogs 7.11 (53) at the MCG. In the grand final St Kilda 9.14 (68) lost to Geelong 12.8 (80) at the MCG.

Fixtures

(Note: in the table above, green rows are wins, red rows are losses. In the Score column St Kilda scores are always shown first.)

Squad

Squad changes
2008 Trade Week: St Kilda completed a trade with the Western Bulldogs to have Farren Ray and Draft Pick #48 in return for St Kilda giving up Draft Pick #31 to the Bulldogs.
2008 National Draft: Tom Lynch, Rhys Stanley, Nicholas Heyne, Alistair Smith, Paul Cahill, Colm Begley
2009 Rookie Draft: Zac Dawson, Tom Simpkin, Brad Howard, Steven Gaertner, Ross Tungatulum, Samuel McGarry, Blake McGrath

Ladder

References

External links
 Official AFL Website of the St Kilda Football Club

St Kilda Football Club seasons
St Kilda Football Club Season, 2009